Lee Frawley (born 26 August 1954) is a US Virgin Islander Paralympic equestrian. She made her debut in the 2012 Summer Paralympics in London. She is the first ever Paralympian to come from the US Virgin Islands.

Lee was born and raised in the US Virgin Islands, though she now lives in the United Kingdom.

References

1954 births
Living people
Equestrians at the 2012 Summer Paralympics
United States Virgin Islands sportswomen
21st-century American women